Saudi Arabia is one of the most successful teams in Asia, having won three AFC Asian Cup titles and is one of the stronger teams in the continent. With influential experiences, the Saudi team has been a major force in the Asian Cup.

The Saudis first qualified to the Asian Cup was in 1984, and it was also the first time Saudi Arabia claimed the title. They repeated the feat in 1988 and 1996, before reaching two other finals, both ended in defeats. Having said, Saudi Arabia also has disappointing performances, notably 2004, 2011 and 2015, when Saudi Arabia crashed out from the group stage. Saudi Arabia will play in 2023 edition, looking on their quest to win the Asian Cup in the new millennia. Saudi Arabia will host the 2027 edition which will mark the first time that the country has ever hosted the Asian Cup.

1984 AFC Asian Cup

Group A

Knockout stage
Semi-finals

Final

1988 AFC Asian Cup

Group B

Knockout stage
Semi-finals

Final

1992 AFC Asian Cup

Group B

Knockout stage
Semi-finals

Final

1996 AFC Asian Cup

Group B

Knockout stage
Quarter-finals

Semi-finals

Final

2000 AFC Asian Cup

Group C

Knockout stage
Quarter-finals

Semi-finals

Final

2004 AFC Asian Cup

Group C

2007 AFC Asian Cup

Group D

Knockout stage
Quarter-finals

Semi-finals

Final

2011 AFC Asian Cup

Group B

2015 AFC Asian Cup

Group B

2019 AFC Asian Cup

Group E

Knockout stage
Round of 16

Record

References

 
Countries at the AFC Asian Cup